The Fourth Council of Dvin was a Church Council held in Dvin the ancient capital city of Armenia in 648. The council was presided over by Catholicos Nerses III of Ishkhantsi (641-661) and was attended by 17 participating bishops.

Background
The council was called by the Armenian Crown and chief Bishops to address the ongoing schism between the Armenian Apostolic Church, and the western Eastern Orthodox and Catholic churches. Of particular concern was the recent schism with the Georgian Church, which had originally sided with Armenia in rejecting the Chalcedon canons but has recently changed sides by supporting Rome and Byzantium. Unsurprisingly a strong case of unification with Georgia was pursued at the council but was ultimately rejected.
 
The council also adopted 12 canons, and strengthened church discipline.

See also
First Council of Dvin 
Second Council of Dvin 
Third Council of Dvin

References 

7th-century church councils
648
Fourth Council
Sasanian Armenia
Medieval Christian controversies
Armenian Apostolic Church
7th century in Armenia
Christianity in the Sasanian Empire
Ecumenical councils
640s in the Sasanian Empire